= Exl-Bühne =

Theatre group in Austria

Exl-Bühne is a theatre group in Austria.
